Thérèse De Grijze (24 August 1926 – 2005) was a Belgian gymnast. She competed in the women's artistic team all-around at the 1948 Summer Olympics.

References

1926 births
2005 deaths
Belgian female artistic gymnasts
Olympic gymnasts of Belgium
Gymnasts at the 1948 Summer Olympics
Sportspeople from Ostend